is a Japanese motorcycle and passenger car wheel manufacturer for both motorsport and street use. 

The company was founded in 1950 and it is also an OEM manufacturer of wheels for production vehicles, mainly in Aluminium wheels for sporty models.

The name Enkei is an abbreviation of its original name at the time of foundation in 1950, Ensyu Keigoukin  (lit. Enshu lightweight alloy), where Enshu is a historical name for Shizuoka prefecture of Japan.

Motorsport involvement
Enkei has been involved in motorsport, most famously in Formula 1 since 1995, supplying wheels for the McLaren F1 Team and in Super GT series.

References

External links
Enkei Global site 
Enkei America 

Companies based in Shizuoka Prefecture
Japanese companies established in 1950
Manufacturing companies established in 1950
Auto parts suppliers of Japan
Wheel manufacturers
Japanese brands
Hamamatsu